Desperately may refer to:

Albums 
Desperately (album), by Barrabás

Songs 
"Desperately" (Bruce Robison song), covered by George Strait
"Desperately" (Don Williams song)
"Desperately", by Michelle Branch from Hotel Paper
"Desperately", by Sara Evans from Stronger